Minor Food Group (Thai: ไมเนอร์ ฟู้ด กรุ๊ป, Chinese: 美诺食品集团) is one of three core subsidiary business under Minor International (traded as MINT on the Stock Exchange of Thailand). It is categorized as Public Company Limited. In food service industry, it is one of the largest restaurant chains in Asia Pacific region. The company was established by William E. Heinecke in 1980. Headquarter is located in Bangkok Metropolis, Thailand. Its address is at Berli Jucker House, 15/F 99 Sukhumvit 42 Rd, Klong Toei Road. Its products includes Casual Dining Restaurant, Quick Service Restaurant (QSR), Food, Food Service and Food Delivery.

As it comprises a number of third parties’ franchises, there have been many restaurant brands operated by the group like The Pizza Company, Swensen’s, Sizzler, Dairy Queen, Burger King, The Coffee Club, Riverside Grilled Fish, Basil, ThaiXpress, Benihana. Nevertheless, it has equity-owned, the Pizza Company, which later became the most visited pizzeria brand in Thailand according to the survey in 2015. Not only those, it also acquires manufacturing plants for dairy and coffee ingredients.

Brief Introduction
At that time, there were only few American fast-food brands in Thailand’s food market. So a pizza franchise as Pizza Hut (at the time) under Minor Food Brand had been introduced. After the pizza franchises have expanded, it brought Sundae ice-cream franchises to Thailand which later became Top-visited ice-cream brand domestically. There gradually has been an increase in importing fast-food franchises to Thailand, while developing own restaurant brand. To reaching more customer and respond to globalization, Minor Food utilizes call center and 1112Delivery application for food delivery purpose.

History of Minor Food's growth in Thailand

The First Pizza Franchise 
Seeing the more influence of Western dining styles in Thai people and few fast-food competitors in the market, Bill Heinecke decided to found Minor Food in 1980. To enter Thailand’s food market, the group selected pizza as its first product.

In 1986, Franchised Swensen's 
Minor Food brought San Francisco’s well-known ice-cream franchises like Swensen’s to Thailand. It has remained high competitive position until today with the classic sundae delights and affordable prices, becoming the most outstanding ice-cream brand in Thai’s market. A few action plans which boost the sales are redesigning the product presentation (chose ‘Sundae menu’) by focusing on new generation target groups, and innovate the menu to fit family target customer.

In 1989, Developed Delivery Services 
Minor Food was the first company to provide home and office delivery. Beginning with pizza delivery service to homes and office, the brand can reach customers without the obstacles of rush-hour crunch and the desire to eat at home.

In 1992, Manufacturing 
Minor Cheese Limited (MCL) and Minor Dairy Limited (MDL) were founded under the consideration of food quality, availability, reliability, and cost control. The major ingredients produced had been delivered to internal franchises and external restaurants. In the same year, it introduced Sizzler, combination meals and salad assortment restaurant outlets, to Thailand. This kind of restaurants allows customers to experience early self-service dining style at the time.

In 1996, Introduced Dairy Queen 
the Dairy Queen, soft serve ice-cream brand was founded after the success of Swensen’s in Thailand during years.  Originated from Illinois, Dairy Queen’s outstanding marketing is ‘Blizzard’ products.

In 2000, Introduced Burger King 
Minor food founded Burger King restaurants in Thailand. It was the first burger franchises with signature menu of The Whopper. To satisfy different groups of customers, it offered International variations by putting exotic ingredients according to the locations. In Thailand, the franchises offer Thai Spiced Chicken with Sticky Rice and other seasonal menu.

In 2001, Built Its Own Brand 
After the contract with Pizza Hut expired, Minor Food decided to have its own pizza brand named ‘The Pizza Company’. Though it was originated in Thailand. It also has the franchises in Kuwait, United Arab Emirates. Saudi Arabia, China, Philippines, Cambodia.

In 2005, Enter Bakery Industry 
It also cooperated to establish intercompany brand as BreadTalk to run bakery business in Thailand with the Breadtalk Group, the Singaporean listed company.

In 2007, Develop Food Delivery Service 
Minor Food was lately developed the first web ordering platform in food delivery businesses, competing with its peers like FoodPanda, Lineman and GrabFood. At the beginning, 1112Delivery application will only serve available in the Bangkok metropolitan area. But the company is processing to expand it to other major cities like Chiang Mai and Phuket by mid-year.  The call center project was implemented  to be the main hotline for other brands under Minor Food Group in early 2019.

International investment

Australia 
It invested in the Australia’s all-hours cafébar and restaurant chain by acquiring half stake in 2008. There are 10+ branches in Thailand in 2016.

China 
Its primary investment in China is buying shares of Beijing Riverside & Courtyard, the local casual dining restaurant chain with expertise of Sichuan cooking dishes. The 49 % of its acquisition makes it begin the operation of China’s food business.

European 
Together with S&P Syndicate PCL, Minor food established Patara Fine Thai Cuisine (PFTC) which is equivalent partnership company. The company is the combination of Thai culinary school and training center for interested and professional individuals. it also invested in Grab Thai, grab-and-go food business in London.

Fact sheet Data
According to its fact sheet of 2019, it currently owns and operates about 2,254 restaurant outlets across the region. Both 2018’s revenue breakdown and NPAT Breakdown shows Minor Food produces the largest market among other brands under Minor International Group. In 2018, Minor Food's total sales were 44 billion baht from 2,270 restaurants in 27 countries.

References

External links
official website

Food and drink companies of Thailand
Minor International